Asra Garg is an Indian Police Service officer from the 2004 batch of Tamil Nadu Cadre. He has been posted in the South Zone, (Madurai region) in The Tamil Nadu Police, since 2022.

Personal life 
Born in the city of Patiala, Garg completed his schooling from DAV in Mansa, Punjab, and later on went to acquire a degree in electrical engineering from Thapar University. Although Garg's mother tongue is Punjabi, he is well-versed in Tamil. His parents are retired lecturers who taught at institutions in Patiala.

Career

Early career 
A 2004 batch officer from the Tamil Nadu Cadre, Garg began his police career at Tirupattur in the Vellore district as the Assistant Superintendent of Police.

Superintendent of Police 

In 2008, Garg was appointed as the Superintendent of Police of Tirunelveli district (Rural), where he held office until 2010. During that period, Garg played a proactive role in managing the usury menace, and played a vital role in saving the people from the money lenders who were charging exorbitant interest rates; he formed a special force to track down and curtail the activities of moneylenders who used goons to collect loans.

Rather than waiting for complaints against any kind of crime, Garg made his team go out and find willing complainants.

Garg was also appreciated for curbing other criminal operations and maintaining the peace in the communally sensitive area.

In 2010, Garg was posted as the Superintendent of Police at the Madurai district, where he set out to fight against corruption and money distribution during the election. The conduct of elections by him was appreciated by election commission of India.

He also helped to resolve a major, long-standing communal conflict. He initiated peace negotiations between the warring Dalits and non-dalits in the village of Uthapuram and ensured the entry of Dalits in the temple. Madras High Court has placed on record the "untiring efforts of the Superintendent of Police, IPS, in not only helping the court in arriving at a proper solution of the dispute, but also for brokering peace between the two warring groups".

Garg also filed several cases against teashop owners in Tirunelveli, Madurai and Dharmapuri districts practicing the discriminatory two-tumbler system, wherein non-dalits are served tea in stainless steel tumblers, while dalits are served in disposable cups.

Garg is known for being humane and innovative in dealing with crimes. One such instance was the release of a woman who had murdered her husband. During the probe, police found out that the man was killed when he attempted to rape their daughter. Following this, Garg ordered her release under section 100 of IPC, holding that the woman, acted in self defense. This brought national attention on the case as an instance of law being not blind after all.

In 2013, Garg was commended for preventing the marriage of an HIV infected man with a young girl in Devadanapatti in Theni District of Tamil Nadu a few minutes before her marriage.

Garg also played a key role in the first conviction in the state in a case of land grabbing which was a very pertinent issue at that time. Besides, in Dharmapuri, Garg busted a kidney trade racket in 2013 by making several arrests and nabbing the kingpin, Garg brought an end to the organ grafting racket, which was one of the crimes with the highest gravity.

Garg took effective action against those involved in female infanticide and got murder cases registered against those involved in female infanticide.

Deputy Inspector General 
In 2016, he went on to deputation to the Central Bureau of Investigation as Superintendent of Police. He was the head of the investigation team which detected the murder case of a school going boy in Ryan International School, Gurgaon which was one of the most sensitive cases in the recent times attracting nationwide attention.

Eventually, Garg was promoted as Deputy Inspector General (DIG) of Police in February 2018, at the Central Bureau of Investigation, New Delhi.

Asra Garg again came into limelight in September 2019 when he got the vice-president of a Hyderabad-based construction company arrested. Mr Ramachandra Rao Patri, Vice President of Soma Enterprise Limited allegedly offered a bribe of ₹2 crores to Mr. Garg for settling a matter against the company. Garg immediately filed a complaint against the company executive and got him arrested.

Inspector General of Police
In 2022, Garg was promoted to the rank of Inspector General of Police and was later posted in the South Zone in Tamil Nadu.

Ranks Held

Awards and honours
Tamil Nadu Chief Minister's Police Medal for Outstanding Devotion to Duty in 2015.

See also 
 Law enforcement in India

References

Sources

Indian police officers
Indian police chiefs
Living people
People from Patiala
1980 births